The 2003–04 CHL season was the 12th season of the Central Hockey League (CHL).

Regular season

Division standings

Note: GP = Games played; W = Wins; L = Losses; SOL = Shootout loss;  Pts = Points; GF = Goals for; GA = Goals against

y - clinched league title; x - clinched playoff spot; e - eliminated from playoff contention

Records
Tulsa Oilers goaltender Rod Branch posted eight shutouts during the 2003–04 season, to affirm his position as the CHL's all-time career shut-out leader with 22.

References

Central Hockey League seasons
CHL